George Templer (?1755–1819), of Shapwick, Somerset, was an English writer, merchant and Member of Parliament. He represented Honiton 1790–1796.

References

Members of the Parliament of Great Britain for Honiton
British MPs 1790–1796